Burton-on-Yore (historically also Burton upon Ure) is a civil parish in the Harrogate district of North Yorkshire, England, facing Masham across the River Ure (historically the River Yore).  There is no village in the parish, but there are two hamlets, Low Burton (or Little Burton) and High Burton (or Great Burton).  The parish also includes Nutwith Cote on the west bank of the Ure, between Masham and Grewelthorpe.  The population of the parish was estimated at 80 in 2012.

Low Burton was the location of Masham railway station from 1875 to 1963. Low Burton Hall dates back to the 15th century.  It was the 15th century home of the Wyvill family, before they became lords of Constable Burton.

Nutwith Cote was a grange of Fountains Abbey.  The present farmhouse dates from the 17th century, and is a Grade II* listed building.

Burton-on-Yore was historically a township in the ancient parish of Masham in the North Riding of Yorkshire.  It became a separate civil parish in 1866.  In 1974 the parish was transferred to the new county of North Yorkshire.  The parish now shares a grouped parish council, known as Masham Parish Council, with Masham,  Swinton with Warthermarske and Ellington High and Low.

References

External links 

Civil parishes in North Yorkshire